USS Chase (DD-323) was a  built for the United States Navy during World War I.

Namesake 
Reuben Chase was born on 23 June 1754. He joined  as a seaman in 1777 and served during John Paul Jones' daring raid into British waters.

Description 
The Clemson class was a repeat of the preceding  although more fuel capacity was added. They had a crew of 6 officers and 108 enlisted men.

Performance differed radically between the ships of the class, often due to poor workmanship. The Clemson class was powered by two steam turbines, each driving one propeller shaft, using steam provided by four water-tube boilers.

The ships were armed with four 4-inch (102 mm) guns in single mounts and were fitted with two  1-pounder guns for anti-aircraft defense. In many ships a shortage of 1-pounders caused them to be replaced by 3-inch (76 mm) guns. Their primary weapon, though, was their torpedo battery of a dozen 21 inch (533 mm) torpedo tubes in four triple mounts. They also carried a pair of depth charge rails. A "Y-gun" depth charge thrower was added to many ships.

Construction and career 
Chase, named for Reuben Chase, was launched 2 September 1919 by Bethlehem Shipbuilding Corporation, San Francisco, California; sponsored by Mrs. J. A. Annear; and commissioned 10 March 1921. Cruising primarily along the west coast of the United States, Chase took part in training operations and fleet maneuvers. She took part in the Presidential Fleet Review at Seattle, Washington, in 1923, and in 1927 cruised in Nicaraguan waters to protect American interests while civil war took place in that country.

Designated for scrapping under the provisions of the London Naval Treaty, Chase was decommissioned at San Diego 15 May 1930, and broken up during 1931.

Notes

References

External links 
http://www.navsource.org/archives/05/323.htm

 

Clemson-class destroyers
Ships built in San Francisco
1919 ships